In statistics, the multivariate t-distribution (or multivariate Student distribution) is a multivariate probability distribution. It is a generalization to random vectors of the Student's t-distribution, which is a distribution applicable to univariate random variables. While the case of a random matrix could be treated within this structure, the matrix t-distribution is distinct and makes particular use of the matrix structure.

Definition

and is said to be distributed as a multivariate t-distribution with parameters .

The constructive definition of a multivariate t-distribution simultaneously serves as a sampling algorithm:
 Compute .

In the special case , the distribution is a multivariate Cauchy distribution.

Derivation

There are in fact many candidates for the multivariate generalization of Student's t-distribution. An extensive survey of the field has been given by Kotz and Nadarajah (2004). The essential issue is to define a probability density function of several variables that is the appropriate generalization of the formula for the univariate case.

and one approach is to write down a corresponding function of several variables. It is clear that this only makes sense when all the marginal distributions have the same degrees of freedom . With , one has a simple choice of multivariate density function

which is the standard but not the only choice.

An important special case is the standard bivariate t-distribution, p = 2:

Note that .

Now, if  is the identity matrix, the density is

The difficulty with the standard representation is revealed by this formula, which does not factorize into the product of the marginal one-dimensional distributions. When  is diagonal the standard representation can be shown to have zero correlation but the marginal distributions do not agree with statistical independence.

Cumulative distribution function 
The definition of the cumulative distribution function (cdf) in one dimension can be extended to multiple dimensions by defining the following probability (here  is a real vector):

Conditional Distribution  
This was demonstrated by Muirhead  though previously derived using the simpler ratio representation above, by Cornish.  Let vector  follow the multivariate t distribution and partition into two subvectors of  elements:

Then

where
  is the conditional mean where it exists or median otherwise.
  is the Schur complement of 

See  for a simple proof of the above conditional distribution.

Copulas based on the multivariate t
The use of such distributions is enjoying renewed interest due to applications in mathematical finance, especially through the use of the Student's t copula.

Elliptical Representation
Constructed as an elliptical distribution and in the simplest centralised case with spherical symmetry and without scaling, the multivariate t PDF takes the form

 

where  and   =  degrees of freedom. Muirhead (section 1.5) refers to this as a multivariate Cauchy distribution.

The aim is to convert the Cartesian PDF to a radial one.  Kibria and Joarder, in a tutorial-style paper, define radial measure   such thatwhich is equivalent to the expected variance of -element vector  treated as a univariate zero-mean random sequence.  They note that  follows the Fisher-Snedecor or  distribution:

having mean value .

 

which is a regular Beta-prime distribution  having mean value .

These results can be derived by straightforward transformation of coordinates from cartesian to spherical.

The enclosed sphere in  dimensions has surface area    and substitution into  shows that the shell has element of probability .  This is equivalent to a radial density function

which simplifies to   where  is the Beta function.

Changing the radial variable to  returns the previous Beta Prime distribution 

To scale the radial variables without changing the radial shape function, define scale matrix  , yielding a 3-parameter Cartesian density function, ie. the probability  in volume element  is

or, in terms of scalar radial variable ,

The moments of all the radial variables can be derived from the Beta Prime distribution. If   then , a known result.

while introducing the scale matrix  yields

Moments relating to radial variable  are found by setting  and  whereupon

Linear Combinations and Affine Transformation

Following section 3.3 of Kibria et.al. let  be a -vector sampled from a central spherical multivariate t distribution with  degrees of freedom: .    is derived from  via a linear transformation:  

 

where  has full rank, then

 

Furthermore, if  is a non-singular matrix then

  

with mean    and covariance .  

Roth (reference below) notes that if  is a  squat matrix with  then  has distribution . 

In the above, the degrees of freedom parameter  remains invariant throughout and all vectors must ultimately derive from one initial isotropic spherical vector   whose elements are not statistically independent.  Adding two sample multivariate t vectors generated with independent Chi-squared samples and different   values:   , as defined in the leading paragraph, will not produce internally consistent distributions, though they will yield a Behrens-Fisher problem.

Related concepts

In univariate statistics, the Student's t-test makes use of Student's t-distribution. Hotelling's T-squared distribution is a distribution that arises in multivariate statistics. The matrix t-distribution is a distribution for random variables arranged in a matrix structure.

See also 
 Multivariate normal distribution, which is the limiting case of the multivariate Student's t-distribution when .
 Chi distribution, the pdf of the scaling factor in the construction the Student's t-distribution and also the 2-norm (or Euclidean norm) of a multivariate normally distributed vector (centered at zero).
Rayleigh distribution#Student's t, random vector length of multivariate t-distribution
 Mahalanobis distance

References

Literature

External links
Copula Methods vs Canonical Multivariate Distributions: the multivariate Student T distribution with general degrees of freedom
Multivariate Student's t distribution

Continuous distributions
Multivariate continuous distributions